The Sylvie and Babs Hi-Fi Companion is an album by Nurse With Wound.

In his book "England's Hidden Reverse", David Keenan describes the album as "some light relief in the early Nurse catalogue". Steven Stapleton told Keenan "I wanted to make a record that was stolen from other people's records". Gary Levermore of Third Mind Records recalled to Keenan that Stapleton was "desperate to get his hands on a copy of Roger Miller's "King Of The Road" in order to incorporate it into the forthcoming record".

Although largely collaged from easy listening records Stapleton acquired in the late-1970s and early-1980s, the album boasted a large cast list of over 40 people. John Balance is one of those who is credited but he did not actually contribute. As Stapleton explained to Keenan "I'd just finished this album with about 40 people on it. He said "Can I be on it?". I said, "It's finished". He said, "I know but can you give me a credit anyway?", I said "Alright then" That was my first meeting with Balance".

Track listing 
 You Walrus Hurt The One You Love
 Great Balls Of Fur

Although all editions of this release contain these two tracks, there are several versions of this album.

An LP issued by LAYLAH came in two different editions, one subject to DMM Mastering (1988), one not (1985) - the music on each of these edition contained minor differences. The 1988 CD edition on L.A.Y.L.A.H. accidentally used the original 1985 mix. A cassette edition issued on United Dairies in 1987 contained a minute of music at the beginning of "Great Balls Of Fur" unheard on any other edition. The 1995 CD on United Dairies was retitled "The Sylvie and Babs High-Thigh Companion" and was again re-edited. The current 2CD United Dirter edition again uses the revised version and adds two new remixes, one by M.S. Waldron (irr.app.(ext.)) and one by Andrew Liles, and random non-LP tracks (some not included on 'Flawed Existence') from the mid-80s.

References 

Nurse with Wound albums
1985 albums